Macon Downtown Airport  is a city-owned public-use airport located three nautical miles (3.5 mi, 5.6 km) southeast of the central business district of Macon, in Bibb County, Georgia, United States. It is also known as Herbert Smart Downtown Airport. The airport is included in the FAA's National Plan of Integrated Airport Systems for 2011–2015, which categorized it as a general aviation facility. It has no scheduled commercial airline service.

History 
Macon Downtown Airport has its origins beginning in World War I as "Camp Wheeler". As early as 1925, Huff Daland Dusters, the precursor of Delta Air Lines, based its crop dusting operation at Camp Wheeler.  In 1936 the City of Macon purchased 250 acres of airfield for $107,000 to replace its inadequate "Miller Field" to support Eastern Air Transport's passenger and mail service to Macon. Then the Works Project Administration began a $500,000 project that included a hangar, a 24 x 56-ft, administration building, and a concrete apron. The new airport was dedicated on November 11, 1937, and named in honor of the current mayor, Herbert Smart.

With the defense buildup in 1940 the Army reactivated Camp Wheeler, adjacent to Smart Field, in March 1941. The 4th Air Depot Group, set up a tent camp at Herbert Smart Airport from September to December 1941 and took part in the "Carolina Maneuvers."  With Warner Robins Field under construction, its prospective commanding officer, Col. Charles Thomas, set up a headquarters under canvas at the Herbert Smart airport in November 1941. On December 6, 1941, the 5th Air Depot Group arrived. Due to the United States' entry into the war, the 4th Air Depot Group shipped out on December 20.

On January 7, 1942, the City of Macon leased the airport's 296 acres to the Army for the duration, the name of the facility being changed to Macon Army Air Base, although the facility was also known as "Smart Field". An additional 95 acres was leased from an individual. The Army then spent approximately $1 million by adding a hangar, barracks for 120 officers and 2,500 men, and additional paving of the airfield among other improvements. In early 1942, a Douglas C-39 (DC-2), a Fairchild C-61, and a PT-18 Stearman were assigned to the airfield. In July, these aircraft moved to the newly opened Robins AAF south of the city.

During the summer of 1942, the 1llth and the 154th Observation Squadrons spent two months at Macon AAF  on maneuvers. In October, the training of chemical warfare troops in air operations and chemical depot duties began. The training unit, known as Chemical Company Air Operations, had 3,200 men present in October 1942. In January 1943, an Aeronca L-3C was assigned to the airfield. The base newspaper, "Smart News," kept the men informed of local, national, and war news. in July 1943, Smart reached a high-water mark with 4,119 enlisted men present.
 
Air Operations companies were equipped and taught to use smoke pots, tear gas, chemical trailers, trucks, blasting caps, and how to fill aircraft spray tanks. The base reportedly received a weekly dosing of tear gas to develop the troop's ability to work with the gas. Smart's chemical warfare troops received small arms training at Camp Wheeler. By the end of 1943, 14 chemical companies had shipped out after having been trained and equipped. The chemical air warfare operations ended on May 16, 1944 when the last unit departed.

For the remainder of the war, training of aviation quartermaster truck companies took place at the airfield. All air operations ended on October 7, 1944 when the airfield was placed on inactive status. The caretaker force numbered one officer and nine men.

Postwar use
Following the war, Delta Air Lines joined Eastern in providing air service at Smart Airport. In 1948, a tornado hit the airport destroying eleven airplanes and a hangar. The airlines then moved to Cochran Field and Smart became a general aviation airport.

During the early 1980s, the City considered closing Smart and turning the property into an industrial park. This proposal was successfully fought by various businesses that used the field with their corporate aircraft. Today, the facility remains as a general aviation airport.

In October 2015, the city-county government and Middle Georgia State University entered into an agreement to add fixed-wing and airport management training programs at the airport, supplementing the university's existing aviation training programs at Heart of Georgia Regional Airport in Eastman, Georgia.

Facilities and aircraft 
It has two asphalt paved runways: 10/28 is 4,696 by 100 feet (1,431 x 30 m) and 15/33 is 3,614 by 75 feet (1,102 x 23 m).

For the 12-month period ending March 17, 2009, the airport had 24,600 aircraft operations, an average of 67 per day: 94% general aviation, 6% air taxi, and <1% military. At that time there were 43 aircraft based at this airport: 74% single-engine, 16% multi-engine, and 9% helicopter.

See also 
 Georgia World War II Army Airfields

References

External links 
 
 

Airfields of the United States Army Air Forces in Georgia (U.S. state)
Airports in Georgia (U.S. state)
Buildings and structures in Macon, Georgia
Transportation in Bibb County, Georgia
Airports established in 1937
1937 establishments in Georgia (U.S. state)